Indonesia Stock Exchange (IDX) (formerly ) is a stock exchange based in Jakarta, Indonesia. It was previously known as the Jakarta Stock Exchange (JSX) before its name changed in 2007 after merging with the Surabaya Stock Exchange (SSX). During recent years, Indonesia Stock Exchange sees fastest membership growth in Asia. As of September 2021, the Indonesia Stock Exchange had 750 listed companies, and total stock investors were about 6.4 million, compared to 2.5 million at the end of 2019. Indonesia Market Capitalization accounted for 45.2% of its nominal GDP in December 2020. 

The current location of the Indonesian Stock Exchange is located in the IDX building in the Sudirman Central Business District, South Jakarta, close to Pacific Place Jakarta.

History

Colonial Era 
Historically, the capital market has existed long before Indonesia's independence. Since the new era of Dutch East Indies government they began to build plantations on a large scale in the Dutch East Indies. Sources of funds in building the plantation were obtained from the Dutch and other Europeans. Stock transactions in securities trading were first recorded in 1892, which was carried out by the Plantation Company in Batavia, namely Cultuur Maatschappij Goalpara, it was written that the company sold 400 shares at a price of 500 guilders per share outstanding. Four years later, Het Centrum also released a prospectus for the sale of shares with a value of up to 105 thousand guilders with a price per share of 100 guilders.

After careful preparation, the first capital market in Indonesia was finally established in Batavia (Jakarta) on 14 December 1912, which was named Vereniging voor de Effectenhandel or Stock Exchange and immediately started trading activities. The capital market at that time was established by the Dutch East Indies government for the benefit of the colonial government. The shares traded are shares or bonds of Dutch companies/plantations operating in Indonesia where the bonds issued by the provincial and municipal governments have company share certificates issued by the administrative office in the Netherlands and then the securities of other Dutch companies.  The development of the capital market in Batavia is so fast that it attracts  people from other city.

The development and growth of the capital market did not go as expected, even during several periods of capital market activity experiencing a vacuum. This was caused by several factors such as the war which required the stock exchange to be closed, including in 1914-1918 the stock exchange was closed due to the occurrence of World War I. During World War II, the Stock Exchanges in Semarang and Surabaya had to be closed again in early 1939, and continued with the closing of the Stock Exchanges in Jakarta in 1942–1952. The transfer of power from the colonial government to the government of the Republic of Indonesia, and various conditions that caused the operation of the stock exchange to not run properly.

Post-Colonial Era

Old Order 
The Jakarta Stock Exchange was re-opened by President Sukarno on 3 June 1952. Until finally the existence of the Stock Exchange was again inactive when there was a nationalization program of Dutch companies in 1956 to 1977. The purpose of this re-opening of the stock exchange was to accommodate government bonds that had been issued in 1956, the previous year. The management of the stock exchange was then handed over to the money and securities trading union consisting of 3 banks and Bank Indonesia as honorary members. The development of this stock exchange is progressing well although the securities traded are generally bonds by Dutch companies and Indonesian government bonds through the Indonesian Development Bank. Through the State Industrial Bank in 1954, 1955 and 1958 bond sales increased.  The occurrence of a power dispute between the Indonesian government and the Netherlands regarding West Irian meant that all Dutch businesses were nationalized through Act No. 86 of 1958. This dispute resulted in securities from the Netherlands no longer being traded on the Jakarta Stock Exchange

New Order 
The Government of the Republic of Indonesia reactivated the capital market in 1977, the Stock Exchange was inaugurated by President Soeharto on 10 August 1977. JSE is run under BAPEPAM (Capital Market Executing Agency). The reactivation of the capital market was also marked by going public with PT Semen Cibinong as the first issuer.

However, in 1977-1987 trading on the Stock Exchange was very sluggish. The number of issuers until 1987 only reached 24 issuers. At that time, people preferred banking instruments to capital market instruments. Finally, in 1987 the Stock Exchange was deregulated by presenting the December 1987 Package (PAKDES 87) which made it easier for companies to conduct Public Offerings and foreign investors to invest in Indonesia. Stock Exchange trading activities also increased in 1988-1990 after the deregulation package in the banking and capital markets was launched. JSE's door is open to foreigners.

The Indonesian Parallel Exchange (BPI) began operating and is managed by the Money and Securities Trading Union (PPUE) in 1988 with its organization consisting of brokers and dealers. In addition, in the same year, the Government issued the December 88 Package (PAKDES 88) which made it easier for companies to go public and several other policies that were positive for capital market growth. The Surabaya Stock Exchange (BES) began operating in 1989 and is managed by a privately owned Limited Liability Company, namely the Surabaya Stock Exchange.

On 12 July 1992, which has been designated as the Anniversary of the JSE, the JSE officially became a private company (privatization). BAPEPAM changed to Capital Market Supervisory Agency (formerly; Capital Market Implementing Agency). One year later on 21 December 1993, PT Pemeringkat Efek Indonesia (PEFINDO) was established. On 22 May 1995, the Jakarta Stock Exchange launched a trading Automated System which was implemented using the JATS (Jakarta Automated Trading Systems) computer system. In the same year on 10 November, the Government of Indonesia issued Act Number 8 of 1995 on Capital Markets. This law came into effect in January 1996. The Indonesia Parallel Exchange was then merged with the Surabaya Stock Exchange. Then one year later, 6 August 1996, the Indonesian Clearing and Guarantee Corporation (KPEI) was established. This was followed by the establishment of the Indonesian Central Securities Depository (KSEI) the following year, 23 December 1997.

Reformation Era 
The scripless trading system in 2000 was applied to the Indonesian capital market, and in 2002 the JSX began to apply the remote trading system. ). In the same year, the change of transaction from T+4 to T+3 was completed. In 2004, the Stock Exchange released Stock Options.

On 30 November 2007, the Surabaya Stock Exchange (BES) and the Jakarta Stock Exchange (JSX) were finally merged and changed their names to the Indonesia Stock Exchange (IDX). After the birth of the IDX, a trading suspension was enforced in 2008 and the Indonesian Stock Price Appraiser (PHEI) was formed in 2009. In addition, in 2009, the Indonesia Stock Exchange changed the old trading system (JATS) and launched a new trading system used by the Indonesian Stock Exchange. IDX until now, namely JATS-NextG. Several other bodies were also established to increase trading activities, such as the establishment of PT Indonesian Capital Market Electronic Library (ICaMEL) in August 2011. The Financial Services Authority (OJK) in January 2012, and at the end of 2012, the Securities Investor Protection Fund(SIPF), and Sharia Principles and Sharia Trading Mechanisms were also launched. IDX also made several updates, on 2 January 2013, the trading hours were updated, and the following year the Lot Size and Tick Price were adjusted again, and in 2015 TICMI merged with ICaMEL.

The Indonesia Stock Exchange also created a campaign called “Yuk Nabung Saham” aimed at all Indonesian people wanting to start investing in the capital market. IDX introduced the campaign for the first time on 12 November 2015, and this campaign is still being implemented today, and in the same year the LQ-45 Index Futures was inaugurated. In 2016, Tick Size and Autorejection limits were adjusted again, IDX Channel was launched, and this year IDX participated in the success of the Tax Amnesty activities and inaugurated the Go Public Information Center . In 2017, IDX Incubator was inaugurated, margin relaxation and inaugurationIndonesia Securities Fund . In 2018, the Trading System and New Data Center were updated, launching T+2 Transaction Settlement (T+2 Settlement ) and Adding Special Notation Information Displays on Listed Company codes.

Stock index 
The Indonesia Stock Exchange (IDX) actively continues to innovate in the development through providing stock indices that can be used by all participants in Indonesia capital market. The index book "IDX Stock Index Handbook" contains a concise overview of the indices provided by the IDX. Currently the Indonesia Stock Exchange has 38 stock indices, as below:

 IDX Composite/ Indeks Harga Saham Gabungan (IHSG), An index that measures the stock price performance of all listed companies in Main Board and Development Board of the Indonesia Stock Exchange.
 IDX80, An index that measures the stock price performance of 80 stocks with relatively large market capitalization, high liquidity, and good fundamentals.
 LQ45, An index that measures the stock price performance of 45 stocks with relatively large market capitalization, high liquidity, and good fundamentals.
 IDX30, An index that measures the stock price performance of 30 stocks with relatively large market capitalization, high liquidity, and good fundamentals.
 IDX Quality30, An index that measures the stock price performance of 30 stocks that historically have relatively high profitability, good solvency, and stable profit growth with high trading liquidity and good financial performance.
 IDX Value30, An index that measures the stock price performance of 30 stocks that have relatively low price valuations with high trading liquidity and good fundamentals.
 IDX Growth30, An index that measures the stock price performance of 30 stocks that have a growth trend in stock prices relative to net profit and revenue with high trading liquidity and good fundamentals.
 IDX ESG Leaders, An index that measures price performance of stocks that become leaders in ESG rating and do not have significant controversies selected from stocks with high trading liquidity and good financial performance. The ESG rating and controversy analysis is developed by Sustainalytics.
 IDX High Dividend 20, An index that measures the stock price performance of 20 stocks that have distributed cash dividends every year over the past 3 years and have relatively high dividend yields.
 IDX BUMN20, An index that measures the stock price performance of 20 stocks of BUMNs (State-Owned Enterprises), BUMDs (Municipal-Owned Enterprises) and their affiliates with relatively large market capitalization and high liquidity.
 Indonesia Sharia Stock Index (ISSI), An index that measures the stock price performance of all listed stocks in Main Board and Development Board of the IDX that included on Sharia Securities List issued by the Financial Services Authority.
 Jakarta Islamic Index 70 (JII70), An index that measures the stock price performance of 70 sharia stocks with relatively large market capitalization and high liquidity.
 Jakarta Islamic Index (JII), An index that measures the stock price performance of 30 sharia stocks with relatively large market capitalization and high liquidity.
 IDX-MES BUMN 17, Index that measures the stock price performance of 17 sharia stocks of State-Owned Enterprises of Indonesia (SOEs) and their affiliates with high liquidity and large market capitalization. IDX-MES BUMN 17 is joint collaboration between Indonesia Stock Exchange (IDX) and The Islamic Economic Society / Masyarakat Ekonomi Syariah (MES).
 IDX Small-Mid Cap (SMC) Composite, An index that measures the stock price performance of listed stocks that have small and medium market capitalization.
 IDX Small-Mid Cap (SMC) Liquid, An index that measures the stock price performance of stocks that have small and medium market capitalization and selected through certain criteria including liquidity and fundamentals .
 KOMPAS100, An index that measures the stock price performance of 100 stocks with relatively large market capitalization, high liquidity, and good fundamentals. KOMPAS100 is a jointly developed index with Kompas Gramedia Group, an Indonesia media corporation.
 BISNIS-27, An index that measures the stock price performance of 27 stocks selected by the Index Committee of Bisnis Indonesia based on fundamental and technical criteria. BISNIS-27 is a jointly developed index with PT Jurnalindo Aksara Grafika, an Indonesia media company (publisher of Bisnis Indonesia daily newspaper).
 MNC36, An index that measures the stock price performance of 36 stocks selected by MNC Group that have large market capitalization and good fundamental performance. MNC36 is a jointly developed index with Media Nusantara Citra (MNC) Group, an Indonesia media corporation.
 Investor33, An index that measures the stock price performance of 33 stocks, selected by PT Media Investor Indonesia, through the technical and fundamental analysis and meet certain criteria. Investor33 is a jointly developed index with PT Media Investor Indonesia, an Indonesia media company (publisher of Bisnis Indonesia daily newspaper).
 infobank15, An index that measures the stock price performance of 15 leading banks with relatively good fundamentals, large market capitalization and high liquidity. infobank15 is a jointly developed index with PT Info Artha Pratama, an Indonesia media company (publisher of infobank magazine).
 SMinfra18, An index that measures the stock price performance of 18 stocks selected from the infrastructure main sector, infrastructure supporting sector, and infrastructure financing sector (from the banking sector) selected based on certain criteria. SMinfra18 is a jointly developed index with PT Sarana Multi Infrastruktur (Persero) (SMI).
 SRI-KEHATI, An index that measures the stock price performance of 25 listed companies, selected by KEHATI Foundation, that have good performance in encouraging sustainable businesses, as well as having an awareness of the environment, social, and good corporate governance or called Sustainable and Responsible Investment (SRI). SRI-KEHATI is a jointly developed index with the Indonesian Biodiversity Foundation (KEHATI Foundation).
 PEFINDO25, An index that measures the stock price performance of 25 stocks of small and medium enterprises (SME) that have relatively good growth potential selected by PEFINDO based on financial performance and stock trading liquidity. PEFINDO25 is a jointly developed index with PT Pemeringkat Efek Indonesia (PEFINDO), an Indonesia credit rating agency.
 PEFINDO i-Grade, An index that measures the stock price performance of 30 stocks that received an investment grade rating (idAAA to idBBB-) from PEFINDO and selected by PEFINDO through certain criteria. PEFINDO i-Grade is a jointly developed index with PT Pemeringkat Efek Indonesia (PEFINDO), an Indonesia credit rating agency.
 IDX Main Board Index, An index that measures the stock price performance of all stocks listed in the Main Board of Indonesia Stock Exchange.
 IDX Development Board Index, An index that measures the stock price performance of all stocks listed in the Development Board of Indonesia Stock Exchange.
 Sectoral Index, an index that measures the price performance of all shares of each industrial sector contained in the Jakarta Stock Industrial Classification (JASICA). Sectoral Index (IDX-IC) which consists of 11 sectors, namely: Energy Sector IDX (IDXENERGY), IDX Raw Goods Sector (IDXBASIC), IDX Industrial Sector (IDXINDUST), IDX Primary Consumer Goods Sector (IDXNONCYC), IDX Non-Primary Consumer Goods Sector (IDXCYCLIC), IDX Health Sector (IDXHEALTH), Financial Sector IDX (IDXFINANCE), IDX Property & Real Estate Sector (IDXPROPERT), IDX Technology Sector (IDXTECHNO), IDX Infrastructure Sector (IDXINFRA), IDX Transportation & Logistics Sector (IDXTRANS).

Regulation

Trading hours
All times are based on the Jakarta Automated Trading System (JATS), currently in WIB (UTC+7)

Prior to 2013, the index opens from 08.00 to 17.40, divided into the following:
 Pre-opening trade (07.30-08.00)
 1st session (Monday-Thursday 08.30-12.30, Fridays 08.30-11.30)
 Lunch break (Monday-Thursday 12.30-13.30, Fridays 11.30-14.00)
 2nd session (Monday-Thursday 13.30-17.00, Fridays 14.00-17.00)

In November 2012, IDX received an approval from the Capital Market and Financial Institution Supervisory Agency (Bapepam-LK) for its plan to start trading 30 minutes earlier and instituting a pre- and post-closing session to avoid price manipulation.

In effect since 2 January 2013, the regular market opens from 09.00 to 17.40, with the following breakdowns:
 Opening session:
 Pre-opening trade (08.45-08.55)
 JATS processes pre-opening prices and recapitulates transactions. (08:55:01 - 08:59:59)
 1st session of all trading (Monday-Thursday 09.00-12.00, Fridays 09.00-11.30)
 Lunch break (Monday-Thursday 12.00-13.30, Fridays 11.30-14.00)
 2nd session of trading (Monday-Thursday 13.30-15.50, Fridays 14.00-15.50) 
 Closing session:
 Pre-closing trade (15.50-16.00)
 JATS processes pre-closing prices and recapitulates transactions. (16:00:01 - 16:04:59)
 Post-closing trade (16.05-16.15)

Negotiated market follows the same time as regular market, but extend to 16:15 on all weekdays.

The trading hour was advanced 30 minutes earlier to accommodate traders from Central and Eastern Indonesia time zones that are one and two hours in advance, respectively. (JATS is based on WIB) The change is also meant to put it in line with other Asian markets, namely Singapore and Hong Kong stock exchanges.

Since the COVID-19 pandemic began, the regular market trading hours in the Indonesian Stock Exchange is open from 09.00 to 15.00, with the following breakdowns:
Opening Session:
 Pre-opening trade (08.45-08.55)
 JATS processes pre-opening prices and recapitulates transactions. (08:55:01 - 08:59:59)
 1st session of all trading (Monday-Friday 09.00-11.30)
 Lunch break (Monday-Friday 11.30-13.30)
 2nd session of trading (Monday-Friday 13.30-14:49:59)
 Closing session:
 Pre-closing trade (14.50-15.00)
 JATS processes pre-closing prices and recapitulates transactions. (15:00:01 - 15:04:59)
 Post-closing trade (15.05-15.15)

Lot and tick price
To increase transactions, starting on 2 May 2016 Indonesia Stock Exchange introduced new tick price with a lot as 100 shares as before.
 below Rp200, the tick price is Rp1
 from Rp200 to below Rp 500, the tick price is Rp2
 from Rp500 to below Rp2,000, the tick price is Rp5
 from Rp2,000 to below Rp5,000, the tick price is Rp10
 equal to or above Rp5,000, the tick price is Rp25

Stock Indices

Two of the primary stock market indices used to measure and report value changes in representative stock groupings are the Jakarta Composite Index and the Jakarta Islamic Index (JII). The JII was established in 2002 to act as a benchmark in measuring market activities based on Sharia (Islamic law). Currently, there are approximately 30 corporate stocks listed on the JII. The FTSE/ASEAN Indices were launched by the five ASEAN exchanges (Singapore Exchange, Bursa Malaysia, The Stock Exchange of Thailand, Jakarta Stock Exchange, and The Philippine Stock Exchange) and global index provider FTSE on 21 September 2005.

The indices, covering the five ASEAN markets, are designed using international standards, free float adjusted, and based on the Industry Classification Benchmark (ICB). The indices comprise FTSE/ASEAN Benchmark Index and FTSE/ASEAN 40 tradable index. The FTSE/ASEAN 40 index is calculated on a real-time basis from 9:00 a.m. and the closing index is calculated at 6:00 p.m. (Singapore time). The FTSE/ASEAN benchmark index is calculated on end-of-day basis.

Besides Jakarta Composite Index and JII, IDX also has 4 more types of index, namely Individual Index, Sector Stock Price Index, LQ 45 Index, Main Board and Development Board Indices.

At 12 May 2011 Indonesia Stock Exchange officially launched a new Indonesia Sharia Stock Index (ISSI), which comprises 214 Indonesian stocks which have been screened by the Majelis Ulama Indonesia (Indonesia Ulema Council).
Fatwa Number 80 from Indonesia Ulema Council is expected to make public no longer have any doubt to make sharia investment in the capital market to eventually increase the number of the domestic investors in the Indonesia Stock Exchange.

IDX Custodian figure
On 7 June 2017, IDX Custodian noted that there are 1,000,289 investors based on Single Identification Number (SID) or increase by 12 percent in less than full 6 months. At the end of 2016, there are 894,116 SID. Slightly more than 50 percent of the investors are local investors. And almost 50 percent of the investors are mutual fund investors.

Incidents

2000 bombing 

On 14 September 2000, a car bomb exploded in the basement of the then-Jakarta Stock Exchange building, killing 15 people. In August 2001 an Indonesian court sentenced two members of the Indonesian special forces unit, Kopassus, Teuku Ismuhadi Jafar and Nuryadin to 20-year jail terms for masterminding the attack.

Walkway collapse 
On 15 January 2018, a mezzanine walkway that was hanging on the second floor of the IDX collapsed, which sustained at least 77 injuries. Most of the injured were university students who were visiting the building, when the incident occurred at about 12:10 WIB (UTC+7:00). Out of the 77 injuries, the 17 victims were hospitalized on RSAL Mintohardjo.

Media
Indonesia Stock Exchange is also operated a business news channel IDX Channel, in partnership with Indonesian media giant Media Nusantara Citra.

See also

 Economy of Indonesia
 IDX Composite
 Jakarta Stock Exchange (JSX)
 List of stock exchanges
 LQ-45
 Surabaya Stock Exchange (SSX)

References

External links
 Otoritas Jasa Keuangan Republik Indonesia
 PT Bursa Efek Indonesia
 PT Kliring Penjaminan Efek Indonesia
 PT Kustodian Sentral Efek Indonesia
 PT Penilai Harga Efek Indonesia
 Indonesia Stock Exchange

 
Financial services companies established in 1912
Stock exchanges in Indonesia
Buildings and structures in Jakarta
Economy of Jakarta
Financial services companies of Indonesia
Indonesian companies established in 1912
Stock exchanges in Southeast Asia